Polis is a 2014 American science fiction short film directed by Steven Ilous. It was written by Steven Ilous and Daniel Perea. It won the New Regency and Defy Media PROTOTYPE competition in January 2015, the prize for which was a feature development deal at New Regency.

Synopsis
Set in the distant future, Polis is a sci-fi thriller about David Porter, a young telepath whose search for his mother threatens to uncover a utopian society’s horrifying secrets.

Accolades
 2015: PROTOTYPE Grand Prize Winner
 2015: Vimeo Staff Pick 
 2015: One Room With a View—Short of the Week (February 9, 2015)

References

External links
 Watch Polis
 Twitter page for Polis
 
 Facebook Page for Polis

2014 science fiction films
2014 short films
2014 films
American science fiction short films
2010s English-language films
2010s American films